Ward 14 Toronto—Danforth is a municipal electoral division in Toronto, Ontario that has been represented in the Toronto City Council since the 2018 municipal election. It was last contested in 2018, with Paula Fletcher elected as the councillor for the 2018–2022 term.

History 
The ward was created in 2018 when the provincial government aligned Toronto's then-44 municipal wards with the 25 corresponding provincial and federal ridings. The current ward is made up of parts of the former Ward 29 Toronto—Danforth, the former Ward 30 Toronto—Danforth and southwest portion of the former Ward 32 Beaches—East York.

2018 municipal election 
Ward 14 was first contested during the 2018 municipal election, with candidates including Ward 30 incumbent Paula Fletcher and Ward 29 incumbent Mary Fragedakis. Fletcher was ultimately elected with 42.27 per cent of the vote.

Geography 
Ward 14 is part of the Toronto and East York community council.

Toronto—Danforth's boundaries mirror its federal and provincial counterparts: bordered on the south by Lake Ontario and Toronto Harbour, on the east by Coxwell Avenue and Coxwell Boulevard, on the north by Taylor Creek and the Don River East Branch, and on the west by the Don River.

Councillors

Election results

See also 

 Municipal elections in Canada
 Municipal government of Toronto
 List of Toronto municipal elections

References

External links 

 Councillor's webpage

Toronto city council wards
2018 establishments in Ontario